Providence Catholic School is a Catholic, college preparatory school for girls in Downtown San Antonio, Texas, USA.  It is accredited by the Texas Catholic Conference Education Department and the Southern Association of Colleges and Schools and is a member of The College Board.  It is a member of the Roman Catholic Archdiocese of San Antonio.

History
The Congregation of Divine Providence (CDP), who had founded Our Lady of the Lake College (now University), established Providence High School as a girls' high school on September 4, 1951, with a broad selection of courses taught by 22 sisters. In 1993, Providence High School was incorporated, and established a decision-making board of directors that includes CDP sisters and civic leaders, educators and others. 
 
In fall of 2005, Providence added a Middle School for girls grades 6-8. It was renamed in 2008 to Providence Catholic School.

Academics
Providence Catholic School offers 13 Advanced Placement courses including AP Biology and Chemistry. Providence also offers electives such as Broadcast Journalism and an Intern program. A variety of visual and performing arts courses are available.

Athletics
Students elect to participate in various competitive athletic activities, from basketball to cross country to track & field and volleyball. Two of the more recent sports additions are tennis and swimming.

Faculty and staff
Providence hosts a faculty of 34, including members of the CDP and lay teachers.

Notes and references

External links

 

Educational institutions established in 1951
Catholic secondary schools in Texas
Girls' schools in Texas
High schools in San Antonio
Schools accredited by the Southern Association of Colleges and Schools
Private middle schools in Texas
1951 establishments in Texas
Congregation of Divine Providence